The  Little League World Series took place on August 19 through 22 in Williamsport, Pennsylvania. Industrial Little League of Monterrey, Nuevo León, Mexico, won its second consecutive Little League World Series by defeating the Jaycee Little League of Kankakee, Illinois, in the 12th Championship Game.

This was the last LLWS to be played at Original Field. This was the first LLWS to include teams from more than four qualifying regions, and also the first to give automatic berths to teams from Canada, represented by the Valleyfield Little League of Valleyfield, Quebec, and to Latin America, represented by Monterrey.

Teams

Bracket

Champions path

Notable players
 Keith Lampard (Portland, Oregon) - former MLB outfielder - Houston Astros
Héctor Torres (Monterrey, Mexico) - former MLB SS, 2B, 3B, and coach
 Carlos "Bobby" Trevino (Monterrey, Mexico) - former MLB  outfielder - California Angels
Rick Wise (Portland, Oregon) - former MLB pitcher

Footnotes

External links
Little League World Series
Line scores for the 1958 LLWS

Little League World Series
Little League World Series
Little League World Series